Franklin Correctional Facility is a medium security state prison in Malone, Franklin County, New York, United States, near Bare Hill Correctional Facility and Upstate Correctional Facility, medium and maximum security prisons, respectively.  It has a capacity for 1730 inmates.

Franklin Correctional Facility opened in 1986.

References

External links  
  Development of the Franklin Correctional Facility

Buildings and structures in Franklin County, New York
Prisons in New York (state)
1986 establishments in New York (state)